Timog Avenue is a major road located in Quezon City within the Diliman area of northeastern Metro Manila, Philippines. It runs east–west through the southern edge of the barangay of South Triangle and is used to be named in English as South Avenue. The street is located in Quezon City's entertainment area, known for its trendy restaurants, bars and karaoke and comedy clubs. It is also home to the GMA Network Center studios located on the avenue's junction with Epifanio de los Santos Avenue (EDSA). The entire avenue is designated as National Route 172 (N172) of the Philippine highway network.

Route description
Timog Avenue is a four-lane road located at the heart of Quezon City's entertainment district. It begins at its junction with EDSA south of East Avenue by South Triangle's border with the central Diliman village of Pinyahan. It heads west from this junction to cross GMA Network Drive and Sergeant Esguerra Avenue towards the 11th World Scout Jamboree Memorial Rotonda on the intersection with Tomas Morato Avenue. Located on or near this eastern section of Timog are the GMA studios, Kamuning MRT Station, Go Hotels, and Imperial Palace Suites Hotel. After crossing the Boy Scout circle, the avenue is dominated by more commercial establishments, including The Shoppes at Victoria which houses a Robinsons Supermarket, Luxent Hotel (positioned as an upscale Business and Family-friendly hotel), Torre Venezia and the Toyama Center. Located on this western section are many popular restaurants, comedy clubs, and cosmetic salons which cater to local actors working in nearby studios. The avenue terminates at the junction with Quezon Avenue south of West Avenue near West Triangle.

History
Timog Avenue was formerly known as South Avenue.

The avenue forms the southern boundary of the formerly proposed  Diliman Quadrangle within the former Diliman Estate also known as Hacienda de Tuason, purchased by the Philippine Commonwealth government in 1939 as the new capital to replace Manila. It was originally planned as the new city's Central Park housing the new national government buildings (the new presidential palace, Capitol Building, and Supreme Court complex) within the  elliptical site now known as the Quezon Memorial Circle. The quadrangle is bordered on the north by North (Hilaga) Avenue, on the east by East (Silangan) Avenue, on the south by Timog (South) Avenue, and on the west by West (Kanluran) Avenue. Designed by American city planner William E. Parsons and Harry Frost, in collaboration with engineer AD Williams and architects Juan Arellano and Louis Croft, the site was also to contain the  national exposition grounds opposite the corner of North Avenue and EDSA (now occupied by SM City North EDSA). The Diliman Quadrangle had been largely undeveloped for decades due to lack of funding. After several revisions, the government planners moved the city center to Novaliches due to its higher elevation. On April 24, 1964, the Quezon City Council renamed streets in the area commemorating the delegates of 11th World Scout Jamboree that died in a plane crash en route to the event held in Greece the previous year. With this, it was to be renamed Boy Scouts Avenue, but the government disagreed. By 1976, the country's capital had been transferred back to Manila with only the Quezon Memorial built in the former capital site. In 1984, the avenue, alongside East Avenue, was renamed to President Carlos P. Garcia Avenue, after the former president.

Intersections

References

Streets in Quezon City
Restaurant districts and streets in the Philippines